Elections were held in the  Davao Region for seats in the House of Representatives of the Philippines on May 10, 2010.

The candidate with the most votes won that district's seat for the 15th Congress of the Philippines.

Summary

Compostela Valley

1st District
Manuel Zamora (popularly known as Way Kurat) is the incumbent. But he is ineligible for re-election since he is on his third consecutive term already. Board member Maricar Apsay will run in his place. Cesar Mancao is co-nominated by the Liberal Party.

2nd District
Rommel Amatong is the incumbent.

Davao City

1st District
Incumbent Prospero Nograles is in his third consecutive term and is ineligible for reelection; he is running for mayor of Davao City. His son Karlo is his party's nominee for the seat. Maria Belen Acosta is also nominated by local party Hugpong sa Tawong Lungsod.

2nd District
Incumbent Vincent Garcia is in his third consecutive term and is ineligible for reelection; his sister Mylene is his party's nominee for the seat and is also nominated by local party Hugpong sa Tawong Lungsod but is an independent.

The result of the election is under protest in the House of Representatives Electoral Tribunal.

3rd District
Isidro Ungab is the incumbent and is also nominated by local party Hugpong sa Tawong Lungsod. He will face former representative Ruy Elias Lopez of the Nationalist People's Coalition (formerly Lakas-Kampi-CMD) in the election.

The result of the election is under protest in the House of Representatives Electoral Tribunal.

Davao del Norte

1st District
Incumbent Arrel Olaño is ineligible for re-election since he is on his third consecutive term already and he is running for Mayor of Tagum. Lakas-Kampi-CMD did not name a nominee in this district.

The result of the election is under protest in the House of Representatives Electoral Tribunal.

2nd District
Incumbent Antonio Lagdameo, Jr. is running unopposed.

Davao del Sur

1st District
Marc Douglas Cagas IV is the incumbent.

2nd District
Franklin Bautista is the incumbent.

Davao Oriental

1st District
Incumbent Nelson Dayanghirang is running unopposed.

2nd District
Thelma Almario is the incumbent.

References

External links
Official website of the Commission on Elections

2010 Philippine general election
2010